Padvariai is a village in Klaipėda County, Lithuania. It is located just north of Kretinga.

References

Villages in Klaipėda County